LIAZ may refer to:

 LIAZ (Czech Republic), a defunct Czech and Czechoslovak manufacturer of trucks
 LiAZ (Russia), a bus manufacturing company in Russia